Anna Vania Mello (born 27 February 1979) is a volleyball player from Italy, who claimed the gold medal with the Women's National Team at the 2002 World Championship in Germany. There she played as a middle-blocker, wearing the number #16 jersey. Vania Mello also competed at the 2000 Summer Olympics.

Honours
 2000 Olympic Games — 9th place 
 2000 FIVB World Grand Prix — 7th place 
 2001 European Championship — 2nd place 
 2002 World Championship — 1st place

References

External links
 
 FIVB Profile

1979 births
Living people
Italian women's volleyball players
Italian expatriate sportspeople in Spain
Expatriate volleyball players in Spain
Volleyball players at the 2000 Summer Olympics
Olympic volleyball players of Italy
Place of birth missing (living people)